The Oneida Railway, which was an interurban rail, was established in 1907 when the New York Central Railroad electrified  of the West Shore Railroad between Syracuse, New York and Utica, New York. The interurban railroad used nontraditional third-rail pickup for power instead of the typical overhead catenary. In 1909 the system merged with the New York State Railways system which remained in business until 1930.

References

Defunct railroads in Syracuse, New York
Defunct New York (state) railroads
Railway companies established in 1907
Railway companies disestablished in 1930
Interurban railways in New York (state)